Tasya Fantasya is a 2016 weekly Philippine drama-fantasy-comedy series broadcast by TV5 starring Shy Carlos, AJ Muhlach and Mark Neumann. It is based on the 1994 film written by Carlo J. Caparas. It aired from February 6, 2016 to April 30, 2016.

Cast

Main cast
Shy Carlos as Tasya / Princess Anastacia
AJ Muhlach as Paeng
Mark Neumann as Noel

Supporting cast
 Ara Mina as Yvonne
 Kim Molina as Jala
 Candy Pangilinan as Benita
 Freddie Webb as Atty. Enriquez
 Donnalyn Bartolome as Tasya's Friend
 Malak So Shdifat as Leina
 Jasmine Hollingworth as Ynez
 John Lapus as Cadio
 Giselle Sanchez as Carning
 Arvic Rivero as Ymer
 Francine Garcia as Tasya's Friend
 Jordan Castillo as Lucky

Guest cast
 Jaycee Parker as Tina Luna
 Christopher Roxas as Col. Luna
 Bekimon as Yves
 Nina Ricci Alagao as Dolce
 Mel Kimura as Mama Helen
 Alonzo Muhlach as Ali
 Niño Muhlach as Nyrus

See also
List of programs broadcast by TV5 (Philippine TV network)

References

External links
Official website of TV5 (Philippines)

TV5 (Philippine TV network) original programming
Philippine drama television series
2016 Philippine television series debuts
2016 Philippine television series endings
Fantaserye and telefantasya
Television series reboots
Filipino-language television shows